East-Finnmark is a district in Troms og Finnmark county, Norway. The district includes the nine municipalities of Berlevåg, Båtsfjord, Gamvik, Lebesby, Nesseby, Sør-Varanger, Tana, Vadsø, and Vardø. The district includes three towns: Vardø, Vadsø, and Kirkenes. The district includes all of the Varanger Peninsula and Nordkinn Peninsula as well as the areas surrounding the Laksefjorden, Tanafjorden, and Varangerfjorden.

References

Districts of Troms og Finnmark